Vălcineț is a commune in Ocnița District, Moldova. It is composed of two villages, Codreni and Vălcineț.

It is also known as Volchinets, Volchenets, Vălcineţ, Vâlcineţi, Volchinets, and Vylchinetsi.

References

Communes of Ocnița District
Populated places on the Dniester